Strangle Woman Creek is a stream in Yukon–Koyukuk Census Area, Alaska, in the United States. It is a tributary of the Coleen River.

The name appears to be local in origin and was recorded by the United States Geological Survey in 1956.

See also
List of rivers of Alaska

References

Rivers of Yukon–Koyukuk Census Area, Alaska
Rivers of Alaska
Rivers of Unorganized Borough, Alaska